Jaime Mario Torres Bodet (17 April 1902 – 13 May 1974) was a prominent Mexican politician and writer who served in the executive cabinet of three Presidents of Mexico.

Life 
Torres Bodet was born in Mexico City. His mother was Emilia Bodet Levallois, a Peruvian of French heritage, and his father was Alejandro Torres Girbent from Barcelona. The couple met in Peru, married and migrated to Mexico in the very late 19th century. His father was a promoter of operas and theatre, activities which impressed Jaime as a young child. Jaime was one of two children. He had a younger brother, Mario, who died very young and to whom Torres Bodet does not refer in his memoirs. His mother was a great influence on him, but his relationship with his father was less close as he was rarely home. He ran the Esperanza Iris Theater and arranged shows such as appearances by Enrico Caruso. The family was wealthy, living in a home on Donceles Street that allow them to see then-president Porfirio Díaz arrive for official business at the Chamber of Deputies across the street.

Both of Torres Bodet's parents stressed literature and the arts. His early education was the purview of his mother, who taught him piano, reading and the Gallic language. This allowed him to enter directly into the third grade when he started school. In 1912, he graduated the sixth grade, he received as a gift the collection of "The Natural Episodes" by Benito Pérez Galdós, along with many other books. He attended high school at the National Preparatory School, where his literary development began, befriending like-minded people in Bernardo Ortiz de Montellano, José Gorostiza, Carlos Pellicer and Luis Garrido.

Torres Bodet came of age during the Mexican Revolution. He published his first book of poems at age 16.

He lost sight in one eye in 1954, while returning to Mexico City from Cuernavaca.

He spent the last years of his life dedicated only to writing his memoirs. According to Solana, he planned to end his life after finishing them. He had decided he had done everything he wanted to do. His diplomatic career ended when he turned 65, forced to retire. He had a wife but no children or nieces and nephews on his side. His decision to commit suicide was also influenced by a 1956 book called The Temple of the Golden Pavilion by Yukio Mishima. He was impressed by the idea of destroying a perfect temple rather than letting it decay. He was also affected by the deaths of various friends and associates after long or debilitating illnesses. In 1974, he ended his life with by gunshot. The official version of the story stated that it was due to a long battle with cancer.  Solana states Torres Bodet was fine both mentally and physically at the time of his death.

Career 
He spoke French, which he learned as a child. This opened both literary and diplomatic doors for him. He was a specialist in French literature, and later learned English and Italian.

At only 18 years of age, in 1920, Torres Bodet was appointed an administrator at the National Preparatory School as well as a teacher of literature at the School of Advanced Studies.In 1921, José Vasconcelos made him his personal secretary. Soon after, he was appointed the head of libraries for the Secretariat of Public Education. In addition to these responsibilities, he founded a magazine called Falange along with several friends and the support of Vasconcelos. He then was appointed to the rectory of the National University (today UNAM), tasked with formulating the legal basis of the new educational system.

In 1929, he published Biombos, Poesias, Destierro (Screens, Poetries, Unearthing). In the same year, he founded with a group of friends a magazine called Los Contemporáneos (Contemporaries). The group behind this publication would become known as the "no grupo" (not a group) or "grupo sin nombre" (nameless group) and consisted of Enrique González Rojo, Benardo Ortiz de Montellano, José Gorostiza, Salvador Novo, Xavier Villaurrutia along with Torres Bodet. The purpose of Contemporáneos was to promote an expressive and poetic movement called Nuevo Ateneo, which had begun in 1924. The publication was quickly criticized as for not being in line with the current revolutionary ideology, nor patriotic enough. In fact, it was apolitical, itself becoming a political statement

From 1938 to 1941 he worked with a younger generation of writers such as Rafael Solana, Octavio Paz, Efraín Huerta and Alberto Quintero on a project and publication called Taller Poético (Poetic Workshop). His work has fallen into relative obscurity since his death despite being well-appreciated during his time.

He had contact with various other writers such as García Lorca, Alberto del Toro Aguirre, Pedro Salinas (Generation of 27), Paul Valery and Valery Larbaud.

Torres Bodet was appointed Secretary of Public Education (1943–46) by President Manuel Ávila Camacho; he then served as the Secretary of Foreign Affairs (1946–1951) under President Miguel Alemán Valdés. He was the ambassador of Mexico to France from 1954 to 1958. Later, in 1958–64, he was again appointed to serve as Secretary of Public Education, this time under President Adolfo López Mateos. He believed that the answer to Mexico's problem lie with education, that it could diminish crime, corruption, lack of employment, etc. This was particularly true with vocational education, despite himself being a poet. According to his personal secretary Rafael Solana, President Manuel Ávila Camacho offered to guarantee him the presidency, but Torres reminded him that it was prohibited under Article 82 of the Mexican Constitution as he was only a first generation Mexican. He retired from public life after his stint as the Secretary of Public Education, rejecting various positions that were offered to him.

Between 1929 and the outbreak of the Second World War, Torres Bodet held diplomatic positions in Madrid, The Hague, Paris, Buenos Aires and Brussels. 
He served as director-general of the United Nations Educational, Scientific and Cultural Organization (UNESCO) from 1948 to 1952. 
From 1955 to 1958 he was Ambassador to France.

He received the Medal of Honor Belisario Domínguez from the Senate in 1971.

He was also a member of the Mexican Language Academy (the national correspondent agency to the Spanish Royal Academy) and of the National College.

Gravely ill with colon cancer, Torres Bodet died by suicide in Mexico City on 13 May 1974.

References

External links 
 Directors-General of UNESCO
 Biografía de: Jaime Torres Bodet (Los Poetas)
 Jaime Torres Bodet (SRE biography)

1902 births
1974 suicides
Members of El Colegio Nacional (Mexico)
Members of the Mexican Academy of Language
Mexican diplomats
Mexican male poets
Mexican male writers
Mexican Secretaries of Education
Mexican Secretaries of Foreign Affairs
Politicians from Mexico City
Writers from Mexico City
Mexican politicians who committed suicide
Recipients of the Belisario Domínguez Medal of Honor
Suicides by firearm in Mexico
UNESCO Directors-General
20th-century Mexican poets
20th-century male writers
Mexican officials of the United Nations